John Piggott may refer to:

 John Piggott (economist), Australian economist
 John Piggott (politician) (1879–1957), Australian politician

See also 
 John Pigott (1550 – by 1627), English politician
 John Edward Pigot (1822–1871), Irish music collector and lawyer